Barsac may refer to:

 Barsac, Drôme, a village in the Drôme department, France
 Barsac, Gironde, a village in the Gironde department, France
 Barsac railway station, its railway station
 Barsac AOC, its wine certification, part of the Sauternes wine region

See also
Barsacq, French surname